The nine bestowments were awards given by Chinese emperors to officials, ostensibly to reward them for their accomplishments.  While the nature of the bestowments was probably established during the Zhou Dynasty, there was no record of anyone receiving them until Wang Mang.  Thereafter, the nine bestowments became typically a sign of a powerful official showing off his complete control of the emperor and establishing his intent to usurp the throne.  For the rest of Chinese history, it became rare for a usurpation to happen without the nine bestowments having been given sometime before. It was almost as rare for the nine bestowments to be given without an usurpation happening, though it did happen (as when Cao Pi gave Sun Quan the nine bestowments in 221 while Sun was briefly Cao Wei's vassal).  Conversely, officials who made important contributions and were offered the nine bestowments would decline them to show their loyalty and lack of intention to usurp the throne.

The nine bestowments
The nine bestowments according to the Classic of Rites, and their meanings, explained in the Han dynasty commentary Bai Hu Tong:

 Gift of a wagon and horses: when the official is appropriate in his modesty and walking in an appropriate manner, so that he does not need to walk any more.
 Gift of clothes: when the official writes well and appropriately, to show his good deeds.
 Gift of armed guards: when the official is brave and willing to speak the truth, so that he can be protected.
 Gift of written music: when the official has love in his heart, so that he can teach the music to his people.
 Gift of a ramp: when the official is appropriate in his acts, so that he can walk on the ramp and maintain his strength.
 Gift of a red door: when the official maintains his household well, so that his household can be shown to be different.
 Gift of arms, bow, and arrows: when the official has good conscience and follows what is right, so that he can represent the central government to stamp out treason.
 Gift of an axe: when the official is strong, wise, and loyal to the imperial household, so that he can execute the wicked.
 Gift of wine: when the official is filially pious, so that he can sacrifice the wine to his ancestors.

Pronunciation 
The reason why the character 錫 (usually pronounced xī in modern Mandarin and meaning "tin") is used, rather than the expected 賜 (cì, meaning "bestowment"), is that 錫 was used as a jiajie (假借, 'rebus') character for "bestowment", interchangeably with 賜 during the times when the ceremonies were first established in the Classic of Rites. Thus, the semantically correct modern reading should be jiǔ cì and not jiǔ xī.

List of recipients of the Nine Bestowments

See also 
 Number nine in Chinese culture
 Nine familial exterminations

References

History of Imperial China
Orders, decorations, and medals of Imperial China